Mihai Robu (10 April 1884 – 27 September 1944) was a Romanian cleric, bishop of the Roman Catholic Diocese of Iași. Born in Săbăoani, Neamț County, He entered the Roman Catholic Theological Institute of Iași in 1894, being ordained deacon in 1906 and priest in 1907. For several years, starting before his priestly ordination, he was in charge of the Iași seminarians. During World War I, when the seminary was closed, he was a parish priest at Văleni, Faraoani and Bacău. In 1920, he returned to teach when the seminary reopened, and was named secretary to Bishop Alexandru Cisar. In 1922, he was named parish priest at Horlești and chaplain at an Iași monastery. In 1925, he was consecrated Bishop of Iași by Cisar. Among his activities were the building of numerous churches, special attention to the seminary and the opening of a new one at Luizi-Călugăra, support for the Catholic press and many visits to parishes in the diocese. In March 1944, due to the approach of the Eastern Front, he closed the seminary and withdrew with the students to Beiuș. Meeting with repression from the German and Hungarian armies, he went to the mountains at Finiș in mid-September. He caught double pneumonia and soon died. Buried in Beiuș, his remains were moved to the old Roman Catholic cathedral in Iași in 1964.

Notes

1884 births
1944 deaths
People from Săbăoani
Deaths from pneumonia in Romania
20th-century Roman Catholic bishops in Romania
World War II refugees